Byker is a surname. Notable people with the surname include:

Carl Byker, American television producer, writer, and director
Gaylen Byker (born 1948), American businessman and academic administrator
Mary Byker (born 1963), English singer, record producer, and DJ

See also
Baker (surname)